is a Japanese screenwriter and film director.

Filmography

Film
Afro Tanaka (2012, director)
Daily Lives of High School Boys (2013, writer, director)
Sweet Poolside (2014, writer, director)
Our Huff and Puff Journey (2014, writer, director)
Wonderful World End (2014, writer, director)
Japanese Girls Never Die (2016, director)
Ice Cream and the Sound of Raindrops (2017, director)
You, Your, Yours (2018, writer, director)
#HandballStrive (2020, writer, director)
Remain in Twilight (2021, writer, director)
The Supporting Actors: The Movie (2021, director)
Just Remembering (2022, writer, director)
Hand (2022)

TV series
Twin Spica (2009, writer)
A Day-Off of Hana Sugisaki (2023, writer, director)

References

External links

1985 births
Japanese film directors
Japanese screenwriters
Living people
People from Fukuoka Prefecture
Writers from Fukuoka Prefecture